The Geyser was a steam powered fireboat built for Bay City, Michigan. At the time she was being built, in 1889, it was anticipated that she would be twice as powerful as any other vessel on the Saginaw River.

References

Fireboats of the United States